Mark Delany is an Australian computer programmer and consultant specializing in e-mail infrastructure and anti-spam techniques.

He is the chief architect and inventor of DomainKeys, an e-mail authentication system designed to verify the DNS domain of an e-mail sender and the message integrity.    Mark is one of the authors of DomainKeys Identified Mail, a development of DomainKeys.

He was also lead architect for Yahoo! Mail.

References

External links
 A Vision Splendid: The History of Australian Computing

People in information technology
Australian computer programmers
Living people
Yahoo! employees
Year of birth missing (living people)